Guy Kelly (November 22, 1906 – February 24, 1940) was an American jazz trumpeter born in Louisiana, perhaps best known for his work in Chicago the 1920s and 1930s with jazz musicians such as Albert Ammons and Jimmie Noone. Kelly worked in New Orleans during the 1920s with bandleaders such as Papa Celestin, among others. Kelly appears on the Noone classic "The Blues Jumped a Rabbit", recorded Chicago January 15, 1936. Kelly died February 24, 1940.

Swing trumpeters
American jazz trumpeters
American male trumpeters
1906 births
1940 deaths
20th-century American musicians
20th-century trumpeters
20th-century American male musicians
American male jazz musicians